Eucalyptus planipes is a species of mallee that is endemic to Western Australia. It has smooth bark, lance-shaped adult leaves, flower buds in groups of three and conical fruit.

Description

Taxonomy
Eucalyptus planipes was first formally described in 2001 by Lawrie Johnson and Ken Hill in the journal Telopea from material collected near Coolgardie in 1983. The specific epithet (planipes) means "flat foot", referring to the pedicels.

Distribution and habitat
This mallee is found on low rises, sandplains and the open woodlands in an area to the south and west of Kalgoorlie, from Norseman to the west of Coolgardie, where it grows in shallow calcareous loam soils over dolerite.

Conservation status
This eucalypt is classified as "not threatened" by the Western Australian Government Department of Parks and Wildlife.

See also
List of Eucalyptus species

References

Eucalypts of Western Australia
planipes
Myrtales of Australia
Plants described in 2001
Mallees (habit)
Taxa named by Lawrence Alexander Sidney Johnson
Taxa named by Ken Hill (botanist)